Rob Ryan (born June 24, 1973) is a former outfielder in Major League Baseball who played for the Arizona Diamondbacks and the Oakland Athletics. He attended Washington State University where he played college baseball for the Cougars from 1993–1996, and was drafted by the Diamondbacks in the 26th round (785th overall pick) of the 1996 Major League Baseball Draft. He signed with the Diamondbacks two days later on June 6. Ryan, who batted and threw left-handed, was listed at 5' 11" in height, and 192 lb in weight.

Major league career

Debut
Ryan made his major league debut on August 20,  with the Diamondbacks against the Pittsburgh Pirates. They were playing at Three Rivers Stadium, with 23,934 people attending the game. In the top of the seventh inning, Ryan was asked to pinch hit for pitcher Greg Swindell, batting ninth. With runners on first and third base, Pirates pitcher Marc Wilkins balked in Ryan's first at-bat, which made all the players on base advance to the next base as a result, with the runner on third, Steve Finley, scoring a run for the Diamondbacks. Ryan ultimately grounded out, second to first, on his at-bat. In the bottom of the seventh, pitcher Dan Plesac was called to replace Ryan, pitching and batting ninth. The Diamondbacks lost the game by the score of 5–4.

Career after debut
On June 19, Ryan was traded by the Diamondbacks to the Oakland Athletics for Ryan Christenson. He played his last major league game on October 7 of that year. One year and two days after being traded, on July 21, 2002, Ryan was purchased by the Boston Red Sox from the Athletics. From this point, Ryan was signed, released, or granted free agency multiple times for about the next three years.

Ryan was then granted free agency on September 30, 2002. On November 18, he signed as a free agent with the Toronto Blue Jays. On June 19, 2003, the Blue Jays released Ryan, who was signed three days later on June 22, this time by the San Francisco Giants as a free agent. He was granted free agency again on October 15. The Houston Astros signed Ryan as a free agent on February 5, 2004. On June 18, he was yet again granted free agency, just to be signed almost a month later by the Florida Marlins as a free agent on July 19. On October 15, Ryan was granted free agency, and was signed again with the Marlins as a free agent on November 11 after the season ended.

References

External links

Baseball Almanac
Fangraphs
The Baseball Nexus

1973 births
Living people
People from Havre, Montana
Major League Baseball outfielders
Arizona Diamondbacks players
Oakland Athletics players
Baseball players from Montana
Washington State Cougars baseball players
South Bend Silver Hawks players
Tucson Sidewinders players
Sacramento River Cats players
Pawtucket Red Sox players
Syracuse SkyChiefs players
Fresno Grizzlies players
Carolina Mudcats players
Albuquerque Isotopes players
New Orleans Zephyrs players
Lethbridge Black Diamonds players